Sigayevsky is a rural locality (a khutor) in Kumylzhenskoye Rural Settlement, Kumylzhensky District, Volgograd Oblast, Russia. The population was 10 as of 2010.

Geography 
Sigayevsky is located in forest steppe, on Khopyorsko-Buzulukskaya Plain, on the bank of the Sukhodol River, 12 km northeast of Kumylzhenskaya (the district's administrative centre) by road. Kumylzhenskaya is the nearest rural locality.

References 

Rural localities in Kumylzhensky District